Lincoln Township is a township in Worth County, Iowa, USA.

History
Lincoln Township was established in 1872.

References

Townships in Worth County, Iowa
Townships in Iowa